Baysangur of Benoy (born 1794, Benoy, Chechnya – died 3 March 1861, Khasavyurt, Chechnya) was a 19th-century North Caucasian commander of Chechen origin . He was one of the naibs (deputies) of Imam Shamil. Baysangur participated in the Caucasian War of 1817–1864.

Biography 
Baysangur was born around 1794 in the aul of Benoy and belonged to the teip of Benoy from Edi Nek'e. In 1825-1826 Baysangur took part in the uprising led by Beibulat Taimiev. In 1828, when Gհazi Muhammad was proclaimed imam of the Caucasian Imamate, Baysangur joined his movement. The aul Benoy became the mainstay of Ghazi Muhammad in Chechnya. In 1839, Baysangur's family received Shamil and his murids after they escaped from the Siege of Akhoulgo.

Naib of Imam Shamil 
By 1846, during a battle with the Russian troops of Count Mikhail Vorontsov, Baysangur lost an arm and an eye, and in 1847, in the battle for Gergebil, his leg was blown off by a cannonball. As a result of this serious injury, he was captured by the tsarist troops, although he was rescued by Shamil's murids, who attacked the convoy that was transporting Baysungur to the fortress of Grozny. According to popular legends, he was tied to a horse so that he could stay in the saddle.

On May 8, 1860, Baysangur and former naibs of Shamil Uma Duyev and Atabi Atayev raised a new uprising in Chechnya. In June of the same year Baysangur's men defeated the Russian Ossetian Muslim Major-General Musa Kundukhov in combat near the town Fachu. Atabi Atayev's rebels thwarted attempts to strengthen the forces of Russian commander Nikolay Yevdokimov, and Duyev's forcesfreed the villages of the Argun Gorge from Russian control. The total strength of the rebel forces at that time reached 1,500. In November, they fought against eight hundred cossacks, 9 infantry battalions, and four rifle companies.

Baysangur's zeal and courage was noted by Imam Shamil in the diary of his bailiff Colonel A. I. Runovsky:

Death 
Alarmed by the uprising of Baysangur, the Russian Army decided to take immediate action. With assistance from Musa Kundukhov, Nikolai Kolovachyov and Artsu Chermoyev, the Russian Army started to round up around the village of Belgatoy thanks for earlier intelligence information of Baysangur's location. Kundukhov used brute force and extreme brutality to crush every Chechen villages remaining, destroying 15 villages in total. Losing their hideout, Baysangur and his men returned to Benoy and tried to continue the resistance, but it was eventually crushed and they were captured.

Baysangur was imprisoned in Khasavyurt and was later sentenced to death by hanging by authority of Major General Pavel Kempert. He was hanged on March 1, 1861.

Since his death, the story of his famed last stand against Russian Army has been popular among Chechens as an example of Chechen heroism.

Memory and image in popular culture 

 There are streets named after Baysangur Benoevsky in a number of settlements of the Chechen Republic and Dagestan.
 Baysangur is a character in the 1972 historical novel by Abuzar Aydamirov "Long Nights".
 The song "Gunib" (1991) by Imam Alimsultanov is dedicated to the defense of Gunib and the participation of Baysangur Benoevsky in these events.
 Chechen bard Timur Mutsurayev dedicated his 1997 song "Baysangur" to the Chechen commander, as well as the song "Gunib" (1998) about the defense of Gunib, in which Baysangur appears.

References

1794 births
1861 deaths
Chechen people
Military leaders
People of the Caucasian War
Warriors from the Russian Empire
North Caucasian independence activists
Naibs of Imam Shamil